Irondale High School is a public high school in New Brighton, Minnesota, United States. Part of the Mounds View Public Schools district, the school is in a suburban area ten miles north of downtown Minneapolis and Saint Paul. Irondale made headlines in late 2011 when it introduced its Early College program, which began in the 2012–13 school year. The program, run in conjunction with Anoka-Ramsey Community College, allows students to graduate in four years with both a high school diploma and an associate's degree. (up to one and a half years towards a degree and/or a minor) This program prompted a visit from US Secretary of Education Arne Duncan, who praised Minnesota's efforts to further education.

Irondale hosts grades 912, and was founded in 1967. It is one of two high schools in the Mounds View Public school district (621), the other being Mounds View High School.

Academics and recognition
Irondale High School was named among the best high schools in the nation by U.S. News & World Report (top 15 in the state of Minnesota) for exceeding expectations when it comes to student performance on reading and math tests, and for preparing students for college.

Irondale was listed in the top 5% of high schools in the country by Newsweek in 2010.  This ranking is based on how much the faculty challenges students by offering AP/IB/Cambridge tests and college-level courses to students.

Irondale was the first high school in the state of Minnesota to offer a comprehensive Early College program.

During the 20062007 school year, the school met all of the requirements for Adequate Yearly Progress and had an AYP graduation rate of 99.05%. The school offers Advanced Placement classes and participates in the University of Minnesota's College in the Schools program.  Nearly 90% of students pursue post-secondary options.

Marching band
Irondale’s marching band was the first Minnesota Marching Band State Champion at the 2005 Youth in Music Band Championships held annually at U.S. Bank Stadium. In 2010 the Irondale Marching Knights took first place in the AA class at the St. Louis Bands of America super regional.

The school’s winter drumline and winter guard was named the Minnesota Percussion Associations State Champion in 1996, 2008, 2009, 2013, 2014, 2016, 2017, 2018 and 2019. The Winter Colorguard has been North Star Circuit State Champions 1993, and from 1996 to 2014, The drumline was also state champion in 2013, 2014, 2016, 2017, 2018, and 2019. The Winter Guard was crowned Scholastic Open Class World Champions in 2002 at WGI, and the Winter Drumline became Scholastic Open Class Bronze Medalists in 2003. The drumline went on to become 2016 and 2017 Scholastic A Class finalists, placing 7th and 8th respectively out of over 60 competing groups at the national competitions. They continued their success at the national level in 2018, becoming Scholastic A Class Silver Medalists by placing 2nd out of 64 groups. In 2022, they also were Class A finalists, placing 10th. The Irondale Drumline is also Minnesota's only high school to medal at WGI World Championships, with their third-place finish in 2003 and second-place finish in 2018.

Robotics 
Irondale has a FIRST Robotics Competition Team, number 2052, named KnightKrawler. In 2016 they were the finalists in the Carson Division at FIRST Championship - St. Louis. In the same year they won the Chairman's Award at the Minnesota 10,000 Lakes Regional.

Sports
The school offers a number of sports. 89% of parents are satisfied with the opportunities for participation in co-curricular activities.

 Football
 Hockey
 Basketball
 Volleyball
 Soccer
 Softball
 Baseball
 Cross Country
 Track and Field
 Swimming
 Tennis
 Ultimate Frisbee
 Dance
 Gymnastics
 Wrestling
 Alpine Skiing
 Nordic Skiing
 Golf
 Lacrosse
 Adapted Hockey
 Adapted Soccer
 Adapted Softball

Activities

 Band
 Choir
 Drama
 Dance Club
 E-sports
 Hackysack Club
 Marching Band
 Math Team
 Mock Trial
 National Honors Society
 Orchestra 
 Quiz Bowl
 Robotics
 Speech
 Stripes
 Trap Shooting
 Winter Drumline

There are many activities that the school offers

Notable alumni
Lisa Bender is a Democratic politician from Minneapolis.
 Scott Bjugstad is a former Olympic and NHL forward (1984–92).
 Members of the band Information Society: Kurt Harland Larson, Paul Robb, and James Cassidy.
 Kate Knuth is a member of the Minnesota House of Representatives, representing District 50B (2007–2013).
 Road Warrior Animal (Joe Laurinaitis) is a member of the professional wrestling tag team The Road Warriors.
 Lee A. Piché, a Roman Catholic bishop
 Randy Rasmussen is a former member of the Minnesota Vikings.
 Premal Shah is the co-founder and president of Kiva.org.

References

External links 

Public high schools in Minnesota
Schools in Ramsey County, Minnesota
Educational institutions established in 1967
1967 establishments in Minnesota